Zhu Jianrong (Simplified Chinese: 朱建荣; born 12 July 1991 in Qingdao) is a Chinese football player who currently plays for Chinese Super League side Qingdao Huanghai on loan from Shanghai Shenhua.

Club career
Zhu Jianrong  started his professional football career with Qingdao Jonoon where he made his senior club debut on March 23, 2009 in a league match against Hangzhou Greentown, but his team lost 1-2. Over the course of the season he was primarily used as a substitute. The following season, Zhu scored his first goal for the club in a league game played on April 17, 2010 against Liaoning Whowin that ended in a 3-3 draw. Zhu would go on to establish himself as a vital member the team until the club were relegated to the second tier at the end of the 2013 Chinese Super League season. Despite this he remained loyal to the team until the club were found guilty on breaking the Chinese FA's rules on contract extensions, resulting in a 7 point deduction that severely hindered the club's promotion push in the 2014 league season. By the 2016 league season the club were heading for relegation and Zhu decided to leave the team.

On 1 December 2016, Zhu moved to Super League side Shanghai Shenhua. He would make his debut for the club on 20 May 2017 coming on as a late substitute for Sun Shilin in a 3-1 defeat to local rivals Shanghai SIPG F.C. Throughout the season he was used sparingly, however he would score his first goal for the club in a 5-1 victory against Yanbian Funde F.C. on 29 October 2017.

International career
Zhu Jianrong was  called up to the U-20 Chinese squad that took part in the 2010 AFC U-19 Championship, where he played in four games, scoring one goal in a tournament that saw China reach the quarter-finals.

Career statistics 
Statistics accurate as of match played 12 January 2022

Honours

Club
Shanghai Shenhua
Chinese FA Cup: 2017, 2019

References

External links

Player stats at Sohu.com

1991 births
Living people
Chinese footballers
Footballers from Qingdao
Qingdao Hainiu F.C. (1990) players
Shanghai Shenhua F.C. players
Qingdao F.C. players
Chinese Super League players
China League One players
Association football forwards